Fayette Township may refer to:

 Fayette Township, Livingston County, Illinois
 Fayette Township, Vigo County, Indiana
 Fayette Township, Decatur County, Iowa
 Fayette Township, Linn County, Iowa
 Fayette Township, Michigan
 Fayette Township, Lawrence County, Ohio
 Fayette Township, Pennsylvania

See also
Lafayette Township (disambiguation)

Township name disambiguation pages